Roussel is a surname of French origin.

List of people
Albert Roussel (1869–1937), French composer
Antoine Roussel (born 1989), French ice hockey player
Athina Onassis Roussel (born 1985), French-Greek equestrian, socialite, and shipping fortune heiress; daughter of Thierry Roussel
Charley Roussel Fomen (born 1989), Cameroonian footballer
Cédric Roussel (born 1978), Belgian footballer
Claude Roussel (born 1930), Canadian sculptor, painter and educator
 Claude Roussel (athlete) (born 1941), French bobsledder.
Dominic Roussel (born 1970), Canadian ice hockey player
Fabien Roussel (born 1969), French politician
Gaëtan Roussel (born 1972), French singer, songwriter, and composer
Gérard Roussel (1500–1550), French Catholic theologian, Renaissance humanist, and bishop of Oloron
Henri François Anne de Roussel (1748–1812), French naturalist
Henry Roussel (1875–1946), French silent film actor, film director, and screenwriter
Hippolyte Roussel (died 1898), French priest and missionary to Polynesia
Jonathan Roussel Toledo (born 1937), Honduran journalist, radio host, and television host
Ker-Xavier Roussel (1867–1944), French painter
Léo Roussel (born 1995), French racing driver
Louis J. Roussel, Jr. (1906–2001) U.S. businessman, banker, and philanthropist
Louie J. Roussel III (born 1946), U.S. racehorse owner and trainer
Louis Lesaffre-Roussel (1802–1869), French businessman, co-founder of food processor Bonduelle S.A.
Nathalie Roussel (born 1956), French actress
Nelly Roussel (1878–1922), French free thinker, anarchist, and feminist
Nicolas-François Roussel d'Hurbal (1763–1849), French viscount and soldier during the Napoleonic and French Revolutionary Wars
Peter Roussel (1941-2022), American press secretary and public ralations executive
Pierre Roussel (1723–1782), French cabinetmaker
Raoul Roussel (1389–1452), French Catholic archbishop of Rouen; involved in the trial of Joan of Arc
Raymond Roussel (1877–1933), French poet, novelist, playwright, musician, and chess enthusiast
Roussel de Bailleul (died 1077), Italo-Norman Byzantine mercenary general and adventurer
Sean Roussel (born 1969), U.S.
Thierry Roussel (born 1953), French businessman; a husband to heiress Christina Onassis; father of Athina Onassis Roussel
Thomas Roussel (born 1985), French ice hockey player
Tom Roussel (born 1945), U.S. football player
Roussel balue Fogue sob bakam (born 1995), Cameroonian linguist 
William Roussel (better known as Meyhna'ch; born 1976), French metal musician and singer

See also
Russell (surname)
Roussel (disambiguation)

French-language surnames